Mary McIntyre may refer to:

 Mary McIntyre, Northern Irish photographer
 Mary McIntyre (artist) (born 1928), New Zealand painter